Trisha Lee Doyle is an Australian politician who was elected to the New South Wales Legislative Assembly as the member for Blue Mountains for the Labor Party at the 2015 New South Wales state election.

Career

Doyle was a school teacher, and worked on the staff of Blue Mountains MP Phil Koperberg between 2007 and 2011. Doyle ran unsuccessfully as the Labor candidate in 2011 when the then incumbent Keneally Labor Government was swept from power. She was later preselected again ahead of the 2015 New South Wales state election as the Labor candidate. The boundaries of the Blue Mountains electorate were redistributed before the election, increasing the margin for the Liberal Party from 4.7 to 5.4 points.

At the 2015 election Doyle topped the first preference vote with 41.2%. There was a swing of 18.7 points toward her on first preferences. In the two party preferred distribution, she beat sitting MP Roza Sage with 58.1% of the TPP vote, an increase of 13.5% from the previous election. This was the first time in its history that the seat of Blue Mountains was not won by an MP from the party that would form Government after that election, breaking the bellwether status of the electorate.

Doyle was sworn into the New South Wales Legislative Assembly on 5 May 2015 by the Governor of New South Wales and made her inaugural speech to the Legislative Assembly on 13 May 2015.

In November 2018, responding to allegations that the then NSW Labor leader, Luke Foley, had — in 2016 — groped an ABC journalist, Doyle called on Mr Foley to resign his leadership by the end of the day and threatened to put a spill motion to the Labor caucus if he refused. He resigned an hour later.

At the New South Wales state election in March 2019, Doyle was re-elected to her second four-year term with a two-party swing toward her of 6.7 points, giving her a final two-party result of 64.9%. This is the highest result achieved by a candidate in the Blue Mountains electorate since its establishment in 1968, besting the previous record holder, Labor's Bob Debus, who received 64.8% of the vote in 2003.

In the July 2019 leadership contest, Doyle supported Jodi McKay against Chris Minns to lead NSW Labor. Doyle was promoted to the Shadow Ministry in July 2019 by McKay, being given responsibility for Emergency Services, Women and the Prevention of Domestic Violence. Doyle was not selected by Minns to continue in the Shadow Cabinet when the latter became NSW Labor leader in June 2021, and returned to the backbench.

Personal life

Doyle grew up in Canberra and the Riverina. As was revealed in her inaugural speech to the NSW Parliament, she grew up in public housing and a home rife with poverty and domestic violence. Doyle attended Macquarie University and graduated with a BA Dip Ed. She is married and lives with her husband Christopher in the upper Blue Mountains. She has two sons, Patrick and Tom. She is good friends with Federal MP Tanya Plibersek.

Electoral History

References

 

Living people
Australian Labor Party members of the Parliament of New South Wales
Members of the New South Wales Legislative Assembly
Year of birth missing (living people)
Place of birth missing (living people)
21st-century Australian politicians
Women members of the New South Wales Legislative Assembly
21st-century Australian women politicians